Rex Wilson (1873–1951) was a British film director of the silent era.

Selected filmography
 Tom Brown's Schooldays (1916)
 The Life of Lord Kitchener (1917)
 Ora Pro Nobis (1917)
 Quinneys (1919)
 Unmarried (1920)
 Tilly of Bloomsbury (1921)
 Housebreaker Charlie (1922)
 St. Elmo (1923)

References

External links

1873 births
1951 deaths
British film directors